The Open Group Architecture Framework (TOGAF) is the most used framework for enterprise architecture as of 2020 that provides an approach for designing, planning, implementing, and governing an enterprise information technology architecture. TOGAF is a high-level approach to design. It is typically modeled at four levels: Business, Application, Data, and Technology. It relies heavily on modularization, standardization, and already existing, proven technologies and products.

TOGAF was developed starting 1995 by The Open Group, based on United States Department of Defense's TAFIM and Capgemini's Integrated Architecture Framework (IAF).  As of 2016, The Open Group claims that TOGAF is employed by 80% of Global 50 companies and 60% of Fortune 500 companies.

Overview 
An architecture framework is a set of tools which can be used for developing a broad range of different architectures. It should:
 describe a method for defining an information system in terms of a set of building blocks.
 show how the building blocks fit together.
 contain a set of tools.
 provide a common vocabulary.
 include a list of recommended standards.
 include a list of compliant products that can be used to implement the building blocks.

The ANSI/IEEE Standard 1471-2000 specification of architecture (of software-intensive systems) may be stated as: "the fundamental organization of a system, embodied in its components, their relationships to each other and the environment, and the principles governing its design and evolution."

However TOGAF has its own view, which may be specified as either a "formal description of a system, or a detailed plan of the system at component level to guide its implementation", or as "the structure of components, their interrelationships, and the principles and guidelines governing their design and evolution over time."

The Architecture Development Method (ADM) is the core of TOGAF which describes a method for developing and managing the lifecycle of enterprise architecture.

History 

TOGAF was initiated in the early 1990s as methodology for the development of technical architecture, and has been developed by The Open Group into an extensive enterprise architecture framework. In 1995, the first version of TOGAF (TOGAF 1.0) was presented. This version was mainly based on the Technical Architecture Framework for Information Management (TAFIM), development started in the late 1980s by the US Department of Defense.

In December 2001 TOGAF 7, the "Technical Edition", was published. TOGAF 8 ("Enterprise Edition") was first published in December 2002 and republished in updated form as TOGAF 8.1 in December 2003. Around 2005 TOGAF became a registered trademark of The Open Group. In November 2006 the Open Group released TOGAF 8.1.1. According to The Open Group, as of February 2011, over 15,000 individuals are TOGAF Certified. As of April 2018 the official register has over 77,500 certifications.

An evolutionary development from TOGAF 8, TOGAF 9 includes many new features such as:
 Increased rigor, including a formal Content Metamodel that links the artifacts of TOGAF together (although there are some problems with the Metamodel)
 Architecture repository and the Enterprise Continuum
 Elimination of unnecessary differences, and many more examples and templates

Additional guidelines and techniques include:

 A formal business-driven approach to architecture 
 Business capability-based planning
 Guidance on how to use TOGAF to develop security architectures and SOA

The latest version is TOGAF 10, launched on 25 April 2022. 

The Open Group provides TOGAF free of charge to organizations for their own internal noncommercial purposes.

TOGAF pillars

Enterprise architecture domains 
TOGAF is based on four interrelated areas of specialization called architecture domains:
 Business architecture which defines the business strategy, governance, organization, and key business processes of the organization
 Data architecture which describes the structure of an organization's logical and physical data assets and the associated data management resources
 Applications architecture which provides a blueprint for the individual systems to be deployed, the interactions between the application systems, and their relationships to the core business processes of the organization with the frameworks for services to be exposed as business functions for integration
 Technical architecture, or technology architecture, which describes the hardware, software, and network infrastructure needed to support the deployment of core, mission-critical applications

Architecture Development Method 
The Architecture Development Method (ADM) is applied to develop an enterprise architecture which will meet the business and information technology needs of an organization. It may be tailored to the organization's needs and is then employed to manage the execution of architecture planning activities.

The process is iterative and cyclic. Each step checks with Requirements. Phase C involves some combination of both Data Architecture and Applications Architecture. Additional clarity can be added between steps B and C in order to provide a complete information architecture.

Performance engineering working practices are applied to the Requirements phase, and to the Business Architecture, Information System Architecture, and Technology architecture phases. Within Information System Architecture, it is applied to both the Data Architecture and Application Architecture.

Enterprise Continuum 
The Enterprise Continuum is a way of classifying solutions and architectures on a continuum that range from generic foundation architectures through to tailored organization-specific both within and outside the Architecture Repository. These include architectural models, architectural patterns, architecture descriptions, and other artifacts. These artifacts may exist within the enterprise and also in the IT industry at large.

The Enterprise Continuum consists of both the Architecture Continuum and the Solutions Continuum. The Architecture Continuum specifies the structuring of reusable architecture assets and includes rules, representations, and relationships of the information systems available to the enterprise. The Solutions Continuum describes the implementation of the Architecture Continuum by defining reusable Solution Building Blocks (SBBs).

Roles 
TOGAF 9.2 recognizes the following roles;

 Architecture Board Members
 Architecture Sponsor
 Architecture Manager
 Architects:
 Enterprise Architect
 Business Architect
 Data Architect
 Application Architect
 Technology Architect
 Project Managers
 IT Designer (Interpreted as UX Design)

Whilst also adding "And many others ..." at the end of this list. 
 Two such roles could be Business Analyst and Systems Analyst.

TOGAF culture 
TOGAF provides certifications for tools & people.

TOGAF certified tools 
Certified TOGAF 9 tools are listed in the following table.

For the latest register of certified tools refer The Open Group register.

Qualifications
The Open Group oversees formal qualifications in TOGAF at two levels, which can be taken following formal training or self-study. Learners can undertake these qualifications through training companies.

Foundation
(Level I) Ensures that an individual understands Enterprise Architecture along with core concepts and terminology of TOGAF.

Certified
(Level II) Further to the Foundation qualification, this establishes that the candidate is able to analyse and apply their knowledge to business problems.

Gaining TOGAF Certified status automatically confers free membership of the Association of Enterprise Architects.

Criticism 
Despite TOGAF being considered as the de facto standard in an EA practice, it is not without its critics:
 Research evidence shows that "most TOGAF recommendations are usually found inapplicable" and not followed even in the organizations included in the list of TOGAF-users provided by The Open Group. That is why TOGAF can be considered only as "a toolkit of random EA-related recommendations" and "'using TOGAF' can be best explained as 'studying TOGAF and then doing something else instead'".
 Real examples demonstrating the actual practical usage of TOGAF's recommendations are missing: "There is a pressing need for some detailed worked examples and use cases. Although these were requested, they were not forthcoming from TOGAF trainers or The Open Group".
 EA practitioners report that TOGAF can hardly be followed step-by-step: "Our initial assumptions about TOGAF were that it would be a sort of 'methodology' that we could follow to produce our EA, however this turned out not to be the case".
 Detailed analysis demonstrates that TOGAF-based EA practices do not resemble the original TOGAF prescriptions in any real sense.
 TOGAF's prescriptions are vague and inarticulate since it "only states that the ADM should be adapted without specifying how".
 Jason Bloomberg argues that "for many organizations, TOGAF has gained traction simply because it’s better than doing nothing".
 The recent changes introduced in TOGAF v9.2 did not address the fundamental problems of the mechanistic planning approach advocated by TOGAF and other previous step-by-step architecture methodologies including EAP and BSP.
 Historical analysis shows that TOGAF's astonishing popularity can be considered as purely accidental and attributed solely to its effective promotion at the right time period.

References

External links 

TOGAF 9.2 Online
TOGAF 8.1.1 Online

Enterprise architecture frameworks
Methodology
Open Group standards